Noether is the family name of several mathematicians (particularly, the Noether family), and the name given to some of their mathematical contributions:

 Max Noether (1844–1921), father of Emmy and Fritz Noether, and discoverer of:
 Noether inequality
 Max Noether's theorem, several theorems
 Emmy Noether (1882–1935), professor at the University of Göttingen and at Bryn Mawr College
 Noether's theorem (or Noether's first theorem)
 Noether's second theorem
 Noether normalization lemma
 Noetherian rings
 Nöther crater, on the far side of the moon, named after Emmy Noether
 Fritz Noether (1884–1941), professor at the University of Tomsk
 Gottfried E. Noether (1915–1991), son of Fritz Noether, statistician at the University of Connecticut

See also
 Noether's theorem (disambiguation)
 List of things named after Emmy Noether

Jewish surnames